Nedo Logli (23 July 1923 – 28 October 2014) was an Italian racing cyclist. He won stage 9 of the 1948 Giro d'Italia.

References

External links
 

1923 births
2014 deaths
Italian male cyclists
Italian Giro d'Italia stage winners
Sportspeople from the Province of Prato
People from Prato
Cyclists from Tuscany